Provisional Siberian Government may refer to:

 Provisional Siberian Government (Vladivostok)
 Provisional Siberian Government (Omsk)